Siegfried Voigt (born 3 October 1950 in Schneeberg, Saxony) is a former East German handball player who competed in the 1972 Summer Olympics and in the 1980 Summer Olympics.

In 1972 he was part of the East German team which finished fourth. He played two matches as goalkeeper.

Eight years later he was a member of the East German handball team which won the gold medal. He played all six matches as goalkeeper.

References
profile
sports-reference

1950 births
Living people
German male handball players
Handball players at the 1972 Summer Olympics
Handball players at the 1980 Summer Olympics
Olympic handball players of East Germany
Olympic gold medalists for East Germany
Olympic medalists in handball
Medalists at the 1980 Summer Olympics
Recipients of the Patriotic Order of Merit
People from Schneeberg, Saxony
Sportspeople from Saxony